Jardim Paulista is a district in the subprefecture of Pinheiros in the city of São Paulo, Brazil. The neighborhood of the same name, located within the district, is one of the neighborhoods that make up the larger region of Jardins, and borders the neighborhoods of Consolação, Cerqueira César and Paraíso.

Jardim Paulista is the area delimited by Paulista Avenue, Peixoto Gomide Street, 9 de Julho Avenue, São Gabriel Avenue, República do Líbano Avenue, and Brigadeiro Luís Antônio Avenue. Many of the streets in Jardim Paulista are named after other municipalities in the state of São Paulo.

Points of interest
Since the district includes Paulista Avenue (the side to the direction of Marginal Pinheiros), many of the famous landmarks on the avenue are part of the district, such as the São Paulo Art Museum (MASP), Trianon Park, and the Conjunto Nacional commercial center.

Companies
Retail conglomerate Grupo Pão de Açúcar has its headquarters in the district. Political consulting firm Cambridge Analytica had an office in the district in 2018.

See also
Jardins

References

Districts of São Paulo